is a Japanese voice actress affiliated with Haikyō. Her major roles include Alicia Florence in Aria, Milly Ashford in Code Geass, Erza Scarlet in Fairy Tail, Irisviel in the Fate/Zero and Fate/kaleid liner Prisma Illya series, Layla Hamilton in Kaleido Star, Michiru Kaiou/Sailor Neptune in Sailor Moon Crystal, Beatrice in Umineko no Naku Koro ni, Yūko Ichihara in xxxHolic and Tsubasa Reservoir Chronicle, and the initial voice of Gammisers in episode 27-34 of Kamen Rider Ghost. She has also voiced in a variety of video games and live-action overseas dubs, and hosts a number of radio shows, many of which are related to her voice projects. In 2013, she received a Best Supporting Actress award at the 7th Seiyu Awards.

Filmography

Anime

Films

Video games

Tokusatsu

Dubbing

Audio dramas

Railway announcements 
 Keikyu Railway (All stations on the Keikyu Line)
 Keio Corporation (All stations on the Keiō Line)
 Tobu Railway (The following stations: Nagareyama-otakanomori, Higashi-Iwatsuki, Kita-omiya, Higashi-mukojima, Umejima, Soka, Matsubara-danchi, Kita-kasukabe, Himemiya, Sugito-takanodai, Satte, Shin-kanuma, Hanyu, Sano, Asaka, Kawagoe, Kawagoeshi, Kasumigaseki, Tsurugashima, Wakaba, Sakado, Takasaka)
 Sotetsu (The following stations: Nishi-yokohama, Hoshikiwa, Minami-makigahara)

References

 Katoh, Hidekazu et al. "Tsubasa - Reservoir Chronicle". (May 2007) Newtype USA. pp. 26–33.

Notes

External links
  
 Official agency profile 
  at GamePlaza-Haruka- Voice Artist DataBase 
 

1975 births
Living people
Aoyama Gakuin University alumni
Japanese radio personalities
Japanese video game actresses
Japanese voice actresses
Seiyu Award winners
Tokyo Actor's Consumer's Cooperative Society voice actors
Voice actresses from Kanagawa Prefecture
20th-century Japanese actresses
21st-century Japanese actresses